Maud Wivianne Bergh (later Freiwald, 14 February 1939 – 19 June 2017) was a Swedish discus thrower. She competed at the 1960 Summer Olympics and finished 12th. Her father Gunnar Bergh was also an Olympic discus thrower. Bergh won the national discus title in 1960, 1962–64 and 1967–68, and set a national record at 52.65 m in 1964.

References

External links
 

1939 births
2017 deaths
Athletes from Gothenburg
Swedish female discus throwers
Olympic athletes of Sweden
Athletes (track and field) at the 1960 Summer Olympics